The 1980 Cupa României Final was the 42nd final of Romania's most prestigious football cup competition. It was disputed between Politehnica Timișoara and Steaua București, and was won by Politehnica Timișoara after a game with 3 goals, in extra time. It was the second cup for Politehnica Timișoara.

Match details

See also 
List of Cupa României finals

References

External links
Romaniansoccer.ro

1980
Cupa
Romania
FC Steaua București matches